Frank Moss (1911–2003) was a U.S. Senator for Utah from 1959 to 1977.

Frank Moss may also refer to:

Frank Moss (footballer, born 1895) (1895–1965), English football player, played for Aston Villa and England
Frank Moss (footballer, born 1909) (1909–1970), English football player, played goalkeeper for Arsenal and England
Frank Moss (footballer, born 1917) (1917–1997), English football player, played for Aston Villa
Frank Moss (lawyer) (1860–1920), criminal lawyer and Assistant District Attorney for New York City
Frank Moss (Virginia politician) (1823 – c. 1883), African-American farmer and politician in Virginia
Frank Moss (technologist) (born 1949), former head of the MIT Media Lab
Frank Moss (rugby union) (1860–1938), English rugby union footballer
Frank A. Moss (1862–1940), mine manager in Western Australia